Lucas Rodríguez Álvarez (born 15 January 1999) is a Uruguayan footballer who plays as a defender for Defensor Sporting in the Uruguayan Primera División.

Career

Club career
After a successful loan spell at Rampla Juniors with 17 league appearances, Rodríguez returned to Defensor Sporting for the 2020 season.

References

External links
Profile at Soccer Punter

1999 births
Living people
Defensor Sporting players
Rampla Juniors players
Uruguayan Primera División players
Uruguayan footballers
Association football defenders